Barry Leitch (born April 27, 1970 in Strathaven, Scotland) is a Scottish video game music composer, responsible for the music in many games spanning multiple consoles and personal computers. Most notable is his work from the Lotus Turbo Challenge,  TFX, Gauntlet Legends, Gauntlet Dark Legacy, Top Gear, and Rush video game series.

Games
 The Addams Family (Game Boy, NES - Ocean)
 Airborne Ranger (Atari ST, Amiga - Microprose)
 American Gladiators (Atari ST, Amiga, Genesis, SNES - Gametek)
 Back to the Future Part III (C64 - Probe - not published)
 Battlefield (C64 - Atlantis Software)
 Boss Rally (PC)
 BSS Jane Seymour (PC - Gremlin Graphics)
 Butcher Hill (Amiga - Gremlin Graphics)
 Captain Blood (Spectrum - Infogrames)
 Captain Courageous (C64 - English Software)
 Championship Manager (PC - Domark)
 Combo Racer (Amiga - Gremlin Graphics)
 Daemonsgate (Atari ST, Amiga, PC - Gremlin Graphics)
 Demoniak (PC - Bitmap Brothers)
 DNA Warrior (Amiga - ACE)
 Double Dragon (C64 Console - Gremlin Graphics)
 Drakan: Order of the Flame (PC - Psygnosis)
 Eek! The Cat (SNES - Ocean)
 Emlyn Hughes International Soccer (C64 - Audiogenic Software 1988)
 Ferrari Formula One (C64, Atari ST, Spectrum, PC - Electronic Arts 1990)
 Fiendish Freddy's Big Top o' Fun (C64, Spectrum, Amstrad)
 Federation of Free Traders (PC - Gremlin Graphics)
 Frankenstein (Amiga - Enigma Variations - possibly never released)
 Gadget Twins (Atari ST, Amiga, Genesis, SNES - Gametek)
 Gauntlet Dark Legacy (Atari ST)
 Gauntlet Legends (Atari ST)
 Gemini Wing (C64, Atari ST, Amiga, Spectrum, Amstrad - The Sales Curve 1988)
 Gilbert (C64, Atari ST, Amiga, Spectrum, Amstrad - Enigma Variations 1989)
 Harlequin (Amiga, Atari ST - Gremlin Graphics 1992)
 HeroQuest (C64, Atari ST, Amiga, Spectrum, Amstrad, PC - Gremlin Graphics)
 Horizon Chase (Android, iOS - Aquiris)
 Horizon Chase Turbo (Xbox, PS4, PC, Switch - Aquiris)
 Horizon Chase 2 (iOS - Aquiris) 
 The Humans (Atari ST, Amiga, PC, Genesis, SNES, Lynx - Mirage)
 Icups (C64 - Odin Software)
 Imperium (PC - Electronic Arts)
 Impossamole (C64, Atari ST, Amiga, Spectrum, Amstrad, PC - Gremlin Graphics)
 Inferno (PC - Ocean)
 Jack Nicklaus Golf (NES - Gremlin Graphics)
 Jane's Apache Longbow (PC CD Audio - Electronic Arts)
 Kick Off 2 (Game Boy, NES - Anco)
 Kill Team (PlayStation, Sega Saturn - not published)
 Legacy (PC - not published)
 Lethal Weapon (Atari ST, Amiga, SNES - Ocean)
 Lords of Chaos (PC - not published)
 Lotus 2 (Atari ST, Amiga - Gremlin Graphics)
 Marauder (C64 - Hewson Consultants 1988)
 MicroProse Soccer (Atari ST, Amiga, Spectrum, Amstrad - Microprose)
 Mindbender (PC - Gremlin Graphics)
 Necromancer (Amiga, PC)
 Nightbreed (RPG) (C64, Spectrum, Amstrad - Ocean)
 Ocean Football (Amiga - Ocean)
 Pegasus (Atari ST, Amiga - Gremlin Graphics)
 Pit-Fighter (PC - Domark)
 Postman Pat (C64, Spectrum, Amstrad - Enigma Variations)
 Powermonger (PC - Electronic Arts)
 Premier League (Amiga - Ocean)
 The President Is Missing (Atari ST, Amiga - Cosmi)
 Privateer Missions (PC - Origin Systems)
 Viking Child (Atari ST, Amiga, Lynx - Gametek)
 Ragnarok (Atari ST, Amiga, PC - Gremlin Graphics)
 Ratpack (Atari ST, Amiga, Spectrum, Amstrad, PC - Microprose)
 Redline (Atari ST, Amiga, PC - Gremlin Graphics)
 RoboCop 3 (PC - Ocean)
 Rock 'n' Roll (Atari ST, Spectrum, Amstrad)
 Rush 2: Extreme Racing USA (N64 - Atari)
 San Francisco Rush 2049 (N64 - Dreamcast - Midway Arcade Treasures 3 (GC, PS2, Xbox))
 Worlds of Ultima: The Savage Empire (Genesis, SNES - Pony Canyon/FCI/Origin Systems)
 Shadow (PC)
 Shockway Rider (Atari ST, Amiga - Faster Than Light)
 First Class with the Shoe People (Atari ST, Amiga, PC - Gremlin Graphics)
 Shut It (PC - Ocean)
 Silkworm (C64, Atari ST, Amiga, Spectrum, Amstrad - Sales Curve)
 Sleepwalker (Amiga CD ROM - Ocean)
 Soccer (Atari ST, Amiga - Gremlin Graphics)
 Space Crusade (C64, Amiga, PC)
 Speedball 2 (PC - Bitmap Brothers)
 Spider (PlayStation, Sega Saturn - Boss Game Studios)
 Starglider 2 (Spectrum - Firebird)
 Stratego (C64, Atari ST, Amiga - Accolade)
 Switchblade (C64 - Gremlin Graphics)
 Switchblade 2 (Atari ST, Amiga - Gremlin Graphics)
 Super Cars (NES - Gremlin Graphics)
 Super Cars II (Atari ST, Amiga - Gremlin Graphics)
 Super Dragon Slayer (C64 - Codemasters)
 Supremacy (PC - Probe)
 Suspicious Cargo (Atari ST, Amiga - Gremlin Graphics)
 Suzuki (PC - Gremlin Graphics)
 Tank (Virtual Boy - not published)
 TFX (Amiga, PC - Ocean)
 Top Gear (SNES - Gremlin Graphics)
 Top Gear Rally (Nintendo 64 - Boss Game Studios)
 Toyota Rally (PC - Gremlin Graphics)
 Treasure Trap (C64, Atari ST, Amiga, PC)
 Twisted Edge Extreme Snowboarding (N64 - Boss Game Studios)
 Universal Studios Classic Monsters (Atari ST, Amiga - Ocean)
 Utopia: The Creation of a Nation (Atari ST, Amiga, PC - Gremlin Graphics)
 Wayne Gretzky's Hockey 99 (N64, Atari)
 Weird Dreams (C64, PC - Firebird)
 Wheel of Fortune (NES - Gametek)
 Wing Commander II: Vengeance of the Kilrathi (Genesis, SNES - Origin Systems)
 Wing Commander III: Heart of the Tiger (PC (in flight dialogue) - Origin Systems)
 Wings of Glory (PC - Origin Systems)
 Xenophobe (C64, Atari ST, Amiga, Spectrum, Amstrad - Microstyle)
 Xiphos (Atari ST, Amiga, PC)
 Zone Warrior (C64, Atari ST, Amiga - Electronic Arts)

References

External links
Official site
Composer profile at OverClocked ReMix

Living people
Video game composers
British composers
1970 births
Tracker musicians
Scottish composers